The North Korean Najin-class frigates are some of the largest vessels in the Korean People's Navy. Although they bear a striking resemblance to ex-Soviet s, they are unrelated to any Russian or Chinese design. The class was originally fitted with a trainable triple  torpedo launcher, which was replaced in the mid-1980s with fixed Styx missile launchers taken from s. The design is inherently dangerous, and even a minor missile failure would result in significant damage to the ship.

In 2023, two or more of these frigates remain active with North Korea's navy a full half-century after they were commissioned. An estimated two or more have been retired, though what has been done with them since then is unknown.

Upgrades
At least one Najin-class ship appears to have been upgraded with much more modern weaponry in 2014. Refitted at Namp'o, the outdated anti-ship missiles, aft  dual cannon, Drum Tilt fire-control radar and surface search radar were removed, and several new systems were installed. Most clearly identifiable are two  automated turrets at the aft, likely based on the Soviet AK-630 CIWS, and two Kh-35 missile racks with the capacity for about eight missiles in place of the older Styx/HY-2 launchers. The modernization program appears to be continuing as of December 2014.

References

Frigates of the Korean People's Navy
Frigate classes